Kellen Transport Incorporated or simply KTI is a city bus company formed as a subsidiary of former Jell Transport, Inc. or JTI. It plies the previous routes from Baclaran, Parañaque to Grotto, San Jose del Monte, Bulacan. Now they operating in EDSA Carousel route under the ES Consortium. It's a subsidiary of ES Transport Inc., which a parent company operates both city and provincial operations.

Etymology
The bus company is derived from its founder and operator, Elena San Pedro Ong, in which the bus company was formed. She is also the operator of former Jell Transport Inc., which plies the previous route Alabang-SM Fairview. and now also operating in EDSA Carousel route under the same consortium.

History

Kellen Transport was established in 2007 as a new sister company of former Jell Transport, Inc. (JTI). Some of JTI buses were transferred to Kellen Transport (KTI), retaining the Baclaran-SM Fairview route before it expanded the route to Grotto, San Jose del Monte, Bulacan. It started with UD Trucks, Isuzu, and Japayuki units before refleeted into King Long air-conditioned units. In the same year, ES Transport has formed its provincial operation for Northern Luzon route, particularly in Nueva Ecija.

When Jell Transport's franchise was revoked in 2010 by the Land Transportation Franchising and Regulatory Board (Philippines) due to involvement in many road accidents along EDSA and Commonwealth Avenue, the company decided to sell other assets, and later bought JKJ Transit Express Corp., a bus company previously operated by CHER Transport Corp., plying the same route, and later continued to buy other franchises, of which Pascual Liner Inc. was another bus company that was chosen, but this time, for Alabang-Novaliches route using the same livery but of different color. They also formed a new bus company known as Earth Star Express, plying Baclaran-Quiapo-SM Fairview route, but the route has changed upon revocation of Jell Transport franchise and now plies route from Sta. Cruz, Manila to Sapang Palay, San Jose del Monte, Bulacan via NLEX Malinta Exit Novaliches SM Fairview.

Kellen Transport continued their operations at present. In 2013, its sister company, ES Transport, has restored its city operation, and added new Yutong units.

Fleet

Kellen Transport maintains and utilizes Golden Dragon, buses with a total of 25 new low floor buses. Additionally, Kellen Transport has roughly more than 100 units from combined ES Transport, Earth Star Express, and JELL Transport (both city and provincial operations) with kinglong, Yutong and Golden Dragon units.

Routes

PITX-Grotto, San Jose del Monte, Bulacan via EDSA Fairview Commonwealth Avenue
PITX-Bagong Silang via EDSA Fairview Commonwealth Avenue – some of these units were operated by ES Transport
Baclaran-SM Fairview via EDSA LRT Ayala Leveriza
EDSA Carousel Busway

Subsidiaries

JKJ Express Corp. – former sister company of CHER Transport Corp., now operated under Earth Star Express and Agila Bus Transport
Alabang-Lagro/SM Fairview via EDSA Commonwealth Avenue*
Angat, Bulacan-Baclaran via EDSA Ayala NLEX Bocaue Exit Norzagaray Sta. Maria***
Angat, Bulacan-Cubao/Farmers via EDSA NLEX Bocaue Exit Norzagaray Sta. Maria
Angat, Bulacan-Divisoria, Manila via NLEX Bocaue Exit Norzagaray Sta. Maria operated by Agila Bus Transport
ES Transport
Metro Manila
Baclaran, Parañaque**
Bagong Silang, Caloocan**
SM Fairview, Quezon City**
Cubao, Quezon City
Sampaloc, Manila
Pasay Rotonda, Pasay
Avenida, Santa Cruz, Manila**
Provincial destinations
Cabanatuan, Nueva Ecija via, NLEX, or SCTEX La Paz, Tarlac City
Tabuk, Kalinga via SCTEX La Paz and TPLEX Victoria Exit, Munoz, San Jose, Bayombong, Solano, Santiago, San Mateo, Cabatuan, Roxas, Isabela
Tungkong Mangga, San Jose del Monte, Bulacan**
Sapang Palay, San Jose del Monte, Bulacan** via Malinta Exit, Novaliches Bayan, SM Fairview & Grotto/Tungko, Marilao Exit or via Bocaue Exit, Guyong-Catmon-Bulac, Santa Maria, Bulacan**
Earth Star Express
Avenida, Santa Cruz, Manila-Sapang Palay, San Jose del Monte, Bulacan** via NLEX Valenzuela/Malinta Exit, Novaliches, SM Fairview, Tungkong Mangga, Quirino Highway
Avenida, Santa Cruz, Manila-Sapang Palay, San Jose del Monte, Bulacan** via NLEX Bocaue Exit
SM Fairview-Baclaran/PITX via Quezon Avenue, Quiapo, Lawton, Taft Avenue
SM Fairview-Alabang via EDSA, Commonwealth Avenue*

(*) denotes this has been a previous route of former Jell Transport Inc., but now operated under JKJ Express and Earth Star Express

(**) denotes these terminals are under city operation

(***)denotes that some units of JKJ were repainted as Shanine & Pauline Transport but these are still operated by JKJ Express

References

Bus companies of the Philippines
Companies based in Bulacan